The 2021 WAFL season (officially the 2021 Optus WAFL Premiership Season) is the 137th season of the various incarnations of the West Australian Football League (WAFL). The season commenced on 2 April and concluded with the Grand Final on 2 October. The West Coast Eagles reserves re-joined the competition, which increased the number of competing clubs to ten.

Clubs

Fixtures

Round 1

Round 2

Round 3

Round 4

Round 5

Round 6

State Game

Round 7

Round 8

Round 9

Round 10

Round 11

Round 12

Round 13

Round 14

Round 15

Round 16

Round 17

Round 18

Round 19

Round 20

Round 21

Round 22

Ladder

Finals series

Qualifying and Elimination Finals

Semi-finals

Preliminary final

Grand Final

See also 
 List of WAFL premiers
 Australian rules football
 West Australian Football League
 Australian Football League
 2021 AFL season
 2021 WAFLW season

References

External links
Official WAFL website

West Australian Football League seasons
WAFL